Operation Birmingham was a military operation of the Vietnam War in War Zone C, north of Saigon conducted by the U.S. 1st Infantry Division and the Army of the Republic of Vietnam (ARVN) 5th Division from 24 April to 17 May 1966.

Background
The objective of the operation was to sweep War Zone C and engage the Viet Cong (VC) 9th Division.

Operation
The operation began on 24 April and in the first few days there was only sporadic contact with VC, however a number of supply caches were located.

On 27 April a battalion of the 1st Brigade killed 3 VC and discovered several tons of supplies, while a battalion of the 3rd Brigade found a battalion-size VC base camp.

On 30 April two battalions of the 1st Brigade swept north along the east bank of the Rach Cai Bac river on the border between South Vietnam and Cambodia attracting fire from both across the river in Cambodia and from the Vietnamese hamlet of Lo Go. The 1st Battalion, 2nd Infantry Regiment engaged the forces firing from Cambodia while the 2nd Battalion, 16th Infantry Regiment engaged the VC in Lo Go. The fighting at Lo Go continued into the afternoon when the VC, latter identified as coming from the C230 Battalion, withdrew leaving 54 dead. U.S. losses were 6 killed.

The operation continued for another two weeks as the 1st Infantry Division swept War Zone C in the hope of finding COSVN headquarters which was believed to located in northern Tây Ninh Province, but there were no other major engagements.

Operation Birmingham also employed two brigades of the Vietnamese Mobile Guerrilla Forces (MGFs) whose primary objective was to locate and engage VC forces as well as to destroy their base camps along the Cambodian border. These brigades moved rapidly to exploit recently acquired intelligence on enemy installations and movements and were frequently transported by helicopter to locations throughout Tây Ninh Province. The MGFs utilized guerrilla warfare tactics that were often employed by the VC against U.S. and ARVN units.

Aftermath
The operation ended on 17 May 1966.

References

External links

Conflicts in 1966
1966 in Vietnam
Birmingham
Birmingham
Birmingham
History of Tây Ninh Province
April 1966 events in Asia
May 1966 events in Asia